Kannan is an Indian film music composer who worked in the Tamil film industry. He debuted in 2010 with Thamizh Padam.

Career
Kannan studied at Music College before beginning his career as a guitarist in 1988. Over the course of a decade, he composed jingles for about 600 commercials through the agency of C. S. Amudhan. The same agency provided the opportunity for Kannan to compose music for his film score debut Thamizh Padam (2010). Kannan revealed that even though the film was a spoof, he "wasn't specifically asked to spoof other songs." The soundtrack received positive reviews from critics who called it an "amusingly memorable debut for Kannan." The songs "Pacha Manja" and "O Maha Zeeya" were well received. Kannan has received more recognition for his contributions to this film than to previous films which went largely unnoticed.

Filmography

References

Living people
Tamil film score composers
Indian film score composers
1997 births